Fred Lee Ogilvie (March 3, 1887 - October 14, 1946) was an American politician and physician from Blodgett, Missouri, who served in the Missouri House of Representatives.  He was educated in the Charleston, Missouri, public schools.  During World War I, Ogilvie served as a captain in the Medical Corps at Fort Riley and Camp Henry Knox.  In 1931, while living in Caruthersville, Missouri, he was the medical director in charge of the malarial control campaign.

References

External links

1887 births
1946 deaths
Democratic Party members of the Missouri House of Representatives
People from Charleston, Missouri
20th-century American politicians
People from Scott County, Missouri
People from Caruthersville, Missouri